Hero of the Underworld is a 2016 drama, inspired by writer/actor/producer Tom Malloy's time working in a New York City hotel. The story centers around hotel manager Dylan Berrick, his desire to help a young woman who is assaulted at the hotel, and his struggles with heroin addiction. Tom Malloy stars alongside Nicole Fox, Quinton Aaron, Chris Ashworth, Gabriel Jarret, and David Josh Lawrence, with appearance by Catherine Mary Stewart. The film was shot in Rochester, NY and directed by John David Vincent.

Plot
In the film, Dylan Berrick is the overnight manager of the Century Grand Hotel, a high class establishment. On the outside, Dylan seems to be a consummately professional hotel manager. But in reality, he is dealing with heroin addiction.

One night, a woman, Holly, is nearly beaten to death in the hotel by her boyfriend, and Dylan finds himself acting as Holly’s savior. This includes not only helping her physically, but also rescuing her from the drug underworld that he is too familiar with. This leads them both on a journey that will help save her as well as his own job, sanity and life.

Cast
 Tom Malloy as Dylan
 Nicole Arianna Fox as Holly 
 Quinton Aaron as Tino
 Catherine Mary Stewart as Shari
 Gabriel Jarret as Rico
 David Josh Lawrence as Jerrod
 Chris Ashworth as Chris
 Krista Kalmus as Candice
 Lisa Varga as Linda
 Erik Aude as Phillip
 Paulo Benedeti as Cesar
 Mark Irvingsen as Henry
 Dale Wade Davis as Sgt. Baker

Production
Filming of Hero of the Underworld took place in March and April, 2014, in Rochester, NY. Standing in for a New York City hotel was Rochester's Times Square Building. Because the location is a working office building, the production had to work nights, redressing the lobby each night and returning it to normal each morning.

While director John Vincent has experience working with film, in this case he shot in digital format using Black Magic cameras. In speaking about the choice of camera and the location, Vincent said, "We also shot in this amazing art deco building, and we really needed to capture the details of that location."

Release
The film was screened at multiple film festivals, including Atlantic City Cinefest, where Tom Malloy won best actor and John Vincent won best director. The film also screened at Desert Rocks Film and Music Event and Chain NYC Film Festival (winner, best actor, Tom Malloy).

Following festivals, Hero of the Underworld was released by Gravitas Ventures in February, 2017, to streaming video and Blu-ray disc.

References

External links
 
 
 

2016 films
Drama films based on actual events
American independent films
2016 independent films
Films shot in New York (state)
Films shot in New York City
Films set in New York (state)
2016 drama films
2010s English-language films
2010s American films